An akim is a mayor or governor in Kazakhstan or Kyrgyzstan.

Akim may also refer to:

 Akim (comics), an adventure comics series published between 1950 and 1983
 Angkatan Keadilan Insan Malaysia (AKIM), a Malaysian political party
 Achim, son of Sadoc, mentioned briefly in the Genealogy of Jesus in Matthew 1:14
 Akim Souab, the main character of French cartoon Wheel Squad
 Akim Tamiroff, an actor

See also
Hakim (disambiguation)
Akeem